Philip Hawksworth (28 April 1913 – 17 January 2003) was a New Zealand badminton player who won several titles at the New Zealand National Badminton Championships from 1936 to 1950.

References 

1913 births
2003 deaths
New Zealand male badminton players
Place of birth missing